Blastobasis decolorella is a moth in the  family Blastobasidae. It is found on Madeira and in Portugal. Records from England and possibly also the Netherlands are based on misidentifications of Blastobasis lacticolella.

References

Moths described in 1858
Blastobasis